The Union of Soviet Socialist Republics (USSR) first participated at the Olympic Games in 1952, and competed at the Summer and Winter Games on 18 occasions subsequently. At six of its nine appearances at the Summer Olympic Games, the Soviet team ranked first in the total number of gold medals won, second three times, and became the biggest contender to the United States' domination in the Summer Games. Similarly, the team was ranked first in the gold medal count seven times and second twice in its nine appearances at the Winter Olympic Games. The Soviet Union's success might be attributed to a heavy state investment in sports to fulfill its political objectives on an international stage.

Following the Russian Revolution of November 1917 and the Russian Civil War (1917–1922), the Soviet Union did not participate in international sporting events on ideological grounds; however, after World War II (1939–1945), dominating the Olympic Games came to be seen by Soviet officials and leaders as a useful method of promoting communism. The Olympic Committee of the USSR was formed on April 21, 1951, and the IOC recognised the new body in its 45th session (May 7, 1951). In the same year, when the Soviet representative Konstantin Andrianov became an IOC member, the USSR officially joined the Olympic Movement.

The 1952 Summer Olympics in Helsinki thus became first Olympic Games for Soviet athletes. On July 20, 1952 Nina Romashkova won the first Olympic gold medal in the history of Soviet sport, competing in the women's discus throw. Romashkova's result in this event (51.42 m) was the new Olympic record at that time.

The 1956 Winter Olympics in Cortina d'Ampezzo became the first Winter Olympic Games for Soviet athletes. There Lyubov Kozyreva won the first Winter Olympic gold medal in the history of Soviet sport, competing in the women's cross-country skiing 10 km event.

The USSR became the host nation for the 1980 Summer Olympics in Moscow. The United States and many other countries boycotted these Games in protest of the Soviet invasion of Afghanistan; the USSR led a boycott of the 1984 Games in Los Angeles.

Although the USSR ceased to exist on December 26, 1991, The Olympic Committee of the USSR formally existed until March 12, 1992, when it disbanded.

In 1992, 7 of the 15 former Soviet Republics competed together as the Unified Team and marched under the Olympic Flag in the Albertville Games, where they finished second in the medal rankings. The Unified Team also competed in the Barcelona Games later in the year (represented by 12 of the 15 ex-Republics), and finished first in the medal rankings at those Games.

Hosted Games
Soviet Union has hosted the Games on one occasion.

Unsuccessful bids

Participation

Timeline of participation

Medal tables

*Purple border colour indicates tournament was held on home soil.

Medals by Summer Games

Medals by Winter Games

Medals by summer sport

Medals by winter sport

Controversy
Soviet Olympic team was notorious for skirting the edge of amateur rules. All Soviet athletes held some nominal jobs, but were in fact state-sponsored and trained full-time. According to many experts, that gave the Soviet Union a huge advantage over the United States and other Western countries, whose athletes were students or real amateurs. Indeed, the Soviet Union monopolized the top place in the medal standings after 1968, and, until its collapse, placed second only once, in the 1984 Winter games, after another Eastern bloc nation, the GDR. Amateur rules were relaxed only in the late 1980s and were almost completely abolished in the 1990s, after the fall of the USSR.

Doping
According to British journalist Andrew Jennings, a KGB colonel stated that the agency's officers had posed as anti-doping authorities from the International Olympic Committee (IOC) to undermine doping tests and that Soviet athletes were "rescued with [these] tremendous efforts". On the topic of the 1980 Summer Olympics, a 1989 Australian study said "There is hardly a medal winner at the Moscow Games, certainly not a gold medal winner, who is not on one sort of drug or another: usually several kinds. The Moscow Games might as well have been called the Chemists' Games."

Documents obtained in 2016 revealed the Soviet Union's plans for a statewide doping system in track and field in preparation for the 1984 Summer Olympics in Los Angeles. Dated prior to the country's decision to boycott the Games, the document detailed the existing steroids operations of the program, along with suggestions for further enhancements. The communication, directed to the Soviet Union's head of track and field, was prepared by Dr. Sergei Portugalov of the Institute for Physical Culture. Portugalov was also one of the main figures involved in the implementation of the Russian doping program prior to the 2016 Summer Olympics.

Flag bearers controversy
Soviet officials expected the flag bearer to show an example of an attractive, physically strong person and a distinguished athlete. He was expected to carry the flag through the Olympic ceremony in one hand unsupported by a harness. Hence the Soviet flag bearers at the opening ceremony of the Summer Olympics were selected from among heavyweight weightlifters or wrestlers, who did not have to compete the next day.

Soviet officials also expected the flag bearer to win a gold medal at the given Olympics. This resulted in absurd situations at the 1952 and 1956 Summer Olympics, when the selected flag bearers, Yakov Kutsenko and Aleksey Medvedev respectively, were not allowed to compete because the officials did not believe they would win a gold medal. Both were top-level heavyweight weightlifters. Kutsenko placed second at the 1950 World Championships and Medvedev won the world title in 1956 and 1957.

See also
 List of flag bearers for the Soviet Union at the Olympics
 :Category:Olympic competitors for the Soviet Union
 Soviet Union at the Paralympics

References

External links
 
 
 
 

 
Soviet